Fort Stephenson (first known as "Fort Sandusky") was built in the early 1800s on the west side of the lower Sandusky River. It was the site in 1813 of an American victory in the Battle of Fort Stephenson during the War of 1812.

The town that later developed here was first named by settlers as "Lower Sandusky", as it was located near the falls of the lower river; it was renamed as Fremont, Ohio. It developed around the fort and a historic Wyandot village known as Junquindundeh.

History
The historic Wyandot village known as Junquindundeh developed at the falls of the Lower Sandusky River.

Later European-American colonists also settled here, as ships could not navigate above this point. Fort Stephenson, first called Fort Sandusky, was constructed here in the early 1800s. It had two blockhouses connected by a palisade stockade of vertical logs. Another blockhouse was located within the fort. It was intended to protect the Lower Sandusky and a nearby supply depot during the War of 1812 with Great Britain. The United States expected attacks from along Lake Erie and Canada. In 1812 US Major George Croghan was assigned as commandant of a garrison of about 150-160 men.

Battle of Fort Stephenson 
On August 1, 1813, a mixed force of British soldiers and allied Native American warriors, said to number 1500 to 2000, led an assault on Fort Stephenson. Over the course of two days, the severely outnumbered garrison of about 160 men, under the leadership of Major George Croghan, repelled all probes by strategically using their marksmanship and a single cannon, dubbed "Old Betsy." The British forces returned the next day but were again unsuccessful in breaching the fort. The British general did not want to lay siege and withdrew his forces to Canada.

Legacy 
After the US army withdrew from the fort, it deteriorated, and settlers helped themselves to the wood. By the late 19th century, there was little left but the stone retaining walls and Old Betsy.

The city and state established what is now Fort Stephenson State Park on the site of the former fort to preserve its remains and commemorate the victory of the Battle of Fort Stephenson. The cannon known as "Old Betsy" is chained off overlooking the northern approach to the site. The main branch of Birchard Public Library was constructed in the Park in 1878, according to the terms of the bequest by Sardis Birchard that endowed the facility. This library serves all of Sandusky County.

The city established recognition and celebration of Major Croghan by designating a "Croghan's Day".  The Sandusky County Soldiers Monument was unveiled in the Park on "Croghan's Day", 1885. Former President Rutherford B. Hayes presided over the event.

Additional commemoration followed on Croghan's Day in 1906, when the remains of Col. George Croghan were reinterred below the soldiers' monument. (They had been transported from his family cemetery in Kentucky.) The Daughters of the American Revolution (DAR) had also arranged to add an historic plaque commemorating his leadership and his garrison's achievement to the Soldiers Monument. The cast bronze plaque is affixed to the pink granite stone of the monument.  
It reads: 
"Fort Stephenson most gallantly defended by Major George Croghan with but 160 men against 1300 British and Indians under Henry Proctor and Tecumseh on August 2, 1813 ___ This tablet erected by Col. George Croghan Chapter Daughters of the American Revolution 1903." (Sic) 

The monument is located in front of the library's entrance on Croghan Street, which was named for the officer. He was promoted to Lt. Colonel for his success in the battle.

References

Further reading
Hurt, R. Douglas. The Ohio Frontier: Crucible of the Old Northwest, 1720-1830. Bloomington, IN: Indiana University Press, 1996.

External links 
About Battle of Fort Stephenson, Sandusky County Scrapbook
"Fort Stephenson", Ohio History Central

Stephenson
Buildings and structures in Fremont, Ohio